The Tour du Bénin is a multi-day road cycling race annually held in Benin. Since 2022 it has been held as a 2.2 category event on the UCI Africa Tour.

Winners

References

Cycle races in Benin
Recurring sporting events established in 1992
UCI Africa Tour races